Chencun (陈村) could refer to 5 township-level settlements in the PRC:

Towns
Chencun, Foshan, in Shunde District, Foshan, Guangdong
Chencun, Fengxiang County, in Fengxiang County, Shaanxi
Chencun, Jiang County, in Jiang County, Shanxi

Townships
Chencun Township, Mianchi County, in Mianchi County, Henan
Chencun Township, Jingning She Autonomous County, in Jingning She Autonomous County, Zhejiang